The  (ETR) is a Japanese third-sector railway operating company established in 2010 to operate passenger railway services on the sections of the JR East Shinetsu Main Line and JR West Hokuriku Main Line within Niigata Prefecture when they were separated from the respective JR Group operators in March 2015, coinciding with the opening of the Hokuriku Shinkansen extension from  to . The main shareholders of the company are Niigata Prefecture, the city of Joetsu, the city of Itoigawa, and the city of Myoko.

Lines

Myōkō Haneuma Line

Service outline
The Rapid service on only holidays which uses 455 series and 413 series has been commenced operated since 4 July 2021.

Stations

Rolling stock
Local services on the Myōkō Haneuma Line use a fleet of ten ET127 series 2-car electric multiple unit (EMU) trains transferred from JR East. These have reinforced front-end skirts, and feature a new livery. They operate as two- or four-car formation during the off-peak periods, and as six-car formations during peak periods. Shirayuki limited express services operated by JR East use four-car E653-1100 series EMUs.

Since 4 July 2021, Rapid service which uses 413 series and 455 series has been commenced operating on Myoko Haneuma Line on only holidays.

Nihonkai Hisui Line

Service outline
At Tomari Station, both ETR trains and Ainokaze Toyama Railway trains use platform 2, allowing a same-platform transfer. The Express service on only holidays which uses 455 series and 413 series has been commenced operated since 4 July 2021, and boarding on this service costs 500 yen.

Stations

Rolling stock
The eastern section of the line is electrified at 1,500 V DC and the western section of the line is electrified at 20 kV AC (60 Hz) overhead, with a dead section separating the two different power supplies between Itoigawa and Kajiyashiki stations, but in order to eliminate the need to procure new dual-voltage rolling stock, local services on the Nihonkai Hisui Line use a fleet of eight new ET122 single-car diesel multiple unit (DMU) trains based on the JR West KiHa 122 series design. This fleet includes two special-event cars. Services normally operate as single-car trains during the off-peak periods, increased to two cars during the peaks.

Since 4 July 2021, Express service which uses 413 series and 455 series has been commenced operating on Hisui Line on only holidays.

History
The company was founded on 22 November 2010. The new names for the two lines to be operated by the company were announced in June 2012, and the company name was changed to Echigo Tokimeki Railway Company from 1 July 2012. The company was formally granted a railway operating license by the Ministry of Land, Infrastructure, Transport and Tourism on 28 February 2014.

Resort train

A two-car ET122-1000 series diesel multiple unit resort train entered service from 23 April 2016, operating over both of the ETR lines. The two-car diesel train is branded .

See also
 List of railway companies in Japan
 List of railway lines in Japan
 Shinano Railway, a third-sector railway company in neighbouring Nagano Prefecture

References

External links

  

Railway companies of Japan
Companies based in Niigata Prefecture
Railway companies established in 2010
1067 mm gauge railways in Japan
Japanese third-sector railway lines
Japanese companies established in 2010